Bergersen is a surname. Notable people with the surname include:

 Birger Bergersen (1891–1977), Norwegian anatomist and politician for the Labour Party
 Fraser Bergersen FRS (born 1929), New Zealand plant biologist
 Gregg Bergersen (born 1956), weapons systems policy analyst for the United States Defense Security Cooperation Agency
 Hans Bergersen Wergeland (born 1861), Norwegian politician
 Ivar Bergersen Sælen (1855–1923), Norwegian Minister of Education and Church Affairs in 1923
 Per Bergersen (1960–1990), musician from Røros, Norway
 Roberto Bergersen (born 1976), American former professional basketball player
 Rolf Bergersen (1906–1966), Norwegian sport shooter, World Champion and Olympic competitor
 Thomas Bergersen (born 1980), Norwegian composer, co-founder of music production company Two Steps From Hell
 Tommy Bergersen (born 1972), Norwegian football coach and former football midfielder

See also
 Mount Bergersen, large mountain rising to 3,170 m, standing at the west side of Byrdbreen in the Sor Rondane Mountains
 Bergesen (disambiguation)